Dagfinnur Halvdanarson (or Dagfinn Halfdansson), was, around the year 1400, Lawman of the Faroe Islands. He is mentioned as such in the Kongsbókin manuscript.

References
G. V. C. Young: Færøerne - fra vikingetiden til reformationen. København 1982. s. 88

Lawmen of the Faroe Islands
Year of birth unknown
Year of death unknown